The Galenstock (3,586 m) is the fourth highest mountain in the Urner Alps in Switzerland. Its summit ridge lies on the border between the cantons of Uri and the Valais.

It was first climbed by Eduard Desor, Daniel Dollfuss Sr., and Daniel Dollfuss Jr., with guides H. Währen, M. Bannholzer, P. Brigger and H. Jaun on 18 August 1845.

Huts
Hotel Tiefenbach (2,109 m)
Albert Heim hut (2,542 m)

References

External links

List of routes (in German)

Mountains of the Alps
Alpine three-thousanders
Mountains of the canton of Uri
Mountains of Valais
Uri–Valais border
Mountains of Switzerland